Reuben Young is an American lawyer and jurist. He was appointed to serve on the North Carolina Court of Appeals by Governor Roy Cooper in 2019 but lost reelection and left on December 31, 2020.

At the time of his appointment to the court, Young was Chief Deputy Secretary for Adult Corrections and Juvenile Justice at the North Carolina Department of Public Safety. He previously served for five years as a Special North Carolina Superior Court Judge and, before that, as Secretary of the North Carolina Department of Public Safety. Young also served as Chief Legal Counsel in the Office of the Governor under Mike Easley. Young received his undergraduate degree from Howard University and his Juris Doctor degree from North Carolina Central University School of Law.

See also
List of African-American jurists

References

Living people
North Carolina Court of Appeals judges
North Carolina lawyers
Howard University alumni
North Carolina Central University alumni
North Carolina Democrats
Year of birth missing (living people)